Fedders is an American company that manufactures air conditioners and other air treatment products.   Founded by Theodore Fedders  in 1896, Fedders is headquartered in the Basking Ridge section of Bernards Township in Somerset County, New Jersey, United States.

Fedders was founded in 1896 by Theodore Fedder as a producer of milk cans, bread pans and kerosene tanks. The company began manufacturing room air conditioners in 1946. Fedders purchased Airtemp from Chrysler in 1976. Fedders also purchased the General Electric room air conditioner and rotary compressor plant in Columbia, Tennessee in 1987.

Fedders Quigan Corp. an American company owns the Fedders trademark in the United States.

References

External links

 Heating, ventilation, and air conditioning companies
Bernards Township, New Jersey
Cooling technology
Companies based in Somerset County, New Jersey
Manufacturing companies established in 1896
1896 establishments in New Jersey